Paul Ray is an American businessman, politician, and former law enforcement officer serving as a member of the Utah House of Representatives. A member of the Republican Party, Ray represents the 13th district, which covers a portion of Davis County, Utah.

Early life and education
Ray was born in Peru, Indiana. He graduated from Peru High School in 1985 and took medicine courses at Indiana University from 1985 to 1988.

Career 
Ray served as a police officer from 1987 to 1988 and also as the branch manager of a bank from 1988 to 1995. He works as the CEO for the Northern Wasatch Home Builders Association.

Politics
Ray was a candidate for the Utah House of Representatives in 1998 but was not elected. He joined the Utah House in 2001 and served in that position until 2003. He ran unsuccessfully for re-election in 2002. He was elected on November 2, 2004, and last elected in 2014.

Ray championed a 2019 law that prevents cities from setting up citizen review boards to oversee local police departments.

In 2021, Ray defended a gerrymandered redistricting map proposal that was heavily tilted in favor of Republicans. The map broke up Utah's liberal urban areas, thus benefiting Republicans. Ray defended the proposed boundaries as "a good balance of urban-rural mix."

Ray resigned as a representative on December 15, 2021 to take a new role as Legislative Affairs with the Utah Department of Health and Human Services. He was replaced by Karen Peterson during a special election of the Davis County Republican Party.

Personal life 
Ray lives in Clinton, Utah, with his wife, Julie, and their four children.

On December 28, 2021, Ray was hospitalized for a cerebral hemorrhage and underwent surgery to alleviate bleeding in the brain.

References

External links
 Official page at the Utah State Legislature
 Paul Ray's Official Campaign Web Site
 Paul Ray on Project Vote Smart: 
 Paul Ray's Campaign Website: 
 Paul Ray on Ballot Pedia: 
 Utah State Legislature biography pages: Paul Ray

Republican Party members of the Utah House of Representatives
Living people
People from Peru, Indiana
Indiana University alumni
21st-century American politicians
Western Governors University alumni
People from Clearfield, Utah
1966 births